Filomeno Orbeta Caseñas (April 15, 1888 – October 6, 1944) was a Boholano politician from Jagna, Bohol. He was a member of the House of Representatives of the Philippines in the 4th, 5th and 9th Legislatures in 1916–1922 and 1931–1934.

Biography
Filomeno Orbeta Caseñas's parents, Catalino Caseñas (November 25, 1864 – March 12, 1925) and Buenaventura Orbeta (July 12, 1866 – February 10, 1926), came from a well-to-do family in Cebu.

Catalino Caseñas was a businessman who taught English to locals. During the Philippine Revolution, his house was burned down by revolutionaries. For safety reasons, the whole family moved to the mountains in barangay Cabungaan. His family returned to the town once the hostilities ceased.

In 1904, Catalino was one of the few literate people in the community, and was appointed as Justice of the Peace in Jagna. However, he kept this position only for two years. He then became involved in local politics, and was elected as the first Mayor of the municipality of Jagna.

He had five siblings: Agustín, Catalina, José, María and Vicenta. Agustin became a governor of undivided Agusan province in 1940, while Jose was once a municipal mayor of Jagna.

Early training
As a child, Filomeno lived with his uncle, Rev. Fr. Filomeno Orbeta, a disciplinarian who was the parish priest in a neighbouring town, receiving instruction in both religion and basic schooling.

When he was old enough, he went to the Seminario de San Carlos in Cebu City to study for priesthood. The revolution interrupted his studies and he was sent back to his family in Jagna. When the revolution ended, he returned to school to resume his studies.

In college, he joined both the student organization and the debating team, where in an inter-class competition, he won the coveted Gorordo Gold Medal for excellence in oratory. The following year, he teamed up with Jose Briones of Cebu (who was later elected a Representative and Senator) to represent their school in an oratory competition against University of Santo Tomas in Manila. They won a pair of gold medals. He then completed his training as a priest, graduating with the highest honors.

At the time of his graduation, he was still two years younger than the required age for ordination. He decided to take on law, and enrolled at the Colegio de Derecho on Manila, where he obtained his bachelor's degree. During this period Filomeno fell in love with a woman, choosing to leave the priesthood, a decision that upset his parents.

References

External links
Bohol Sunday Post - 141 Jagnaanons get recognitions
Jagna
Republic of the Philippines House of Representatives
Central Visayan Institute - Foundation
https://www.youtube.com/embed/cmYljCepS-8?rel=0
About Jagna - Previous Mayors
Barangay Cabungaan

1888 births
1944 deaths
Nacionalista Party politicians
Members of the House of Representatives of the Philippines from Bohol
People from Bohol
Mayors of places in Bohol
University of San Carlos alumni
Members of the Philippine Legislature